The 1890 Cardiff County Borough Council election was held on Saturday 1 November 1890 to elect councillors to Cardiff County Borough Council in Cardiff, Wales. These were the second all-Cardiff elections since the creation of the county borough. They were first to take place since the increase in number of electoral wards from four to ten.

Background
Cardiff had become a county borough on 1 April 1889 as a result of the Local Government Act 1888. With its municipal year running from November, the November 1889 elections were the first all-Cardiff elections in the town since becoming a county borough. In July 1890 the town's ward boundaries were redrawn, increasing the number of electoral wards from five to ten. On 25 July the General Purposes Committee of the council had redistributed the existing councillors over the ten wards.

The November 1890 elections were the second all-Cardiff elections in the county borough. Not all council seats were up for election, because councillors stood down for election in three-yearly rotation. The next all-Cardiff election took place in November 1891.

The council consisted of 30 councillors who were elected by the town's voters and ten aldermen who were elected by the councillors.

Overview of the result

Contests took place in all ten electoral wards, namely Adamsdown, Canton, Cathays, Central, Grangetown, Park, Riverside, Roath, South and Splott. One council seat was up for election in all wards except for Riverside, where two seats were up for election because of the recent death of a sitting councillor. Prior to the election, seven of the eleven seats were held by the Liberal Party and four by the Conservatives. The election resulted in the Liberals increasing their overall representation by one. The Liberals received 6,518 votes in comparison with 5,535 for the Conservative candidates.

Notable defeats included Sir Morgan Morgan in the Park ward, who lost to the Liberal candidate by 98 votes.

Council composition
Following these elections, the council's Liberal majority increased by two, with 25 Liberal members and 15 Conservatives.

Ward results

Adamsdown

Canton

Cathays

Central

Mr Proger had represented the ward for the previous 12 years.

Grangetown

John Jenkins, a shipwright and a nominee of Cardiff Trades Council, was declared to be the first genuine working man's representative elected to the council.

Park

Despite trailing by 100 votes after the first count, Sir Morgan Morgan's supporters demanded two recounts before conceding defeat.

Riverside  (two seats)

An election was held on the same date, for the seat of Conservative councillor Smith, who had recently died.

Roath

South

Splott

* = 'retiring' ward councillor for re-election

References

Cardiff
Council elections in Cardiff
19th century in Cardiff